Culladia miria is a moth in the family Crambidae. It was described by Stanisław Błeszyński in 1970. It is found on Sumatra.

References

Crambini
Moths described in 1970
Moths of Asia